David Anderson Cargill (21 July 1936 – 20 November 2011) was a Scottish former professional footballer, who played as a left winger.

References

External links
Arbroath footballer played for five different clubs Arbroath Herald (3 December 2011)

1936 births
2011 deaths
Scottish footballers
Association football wingers
Burnley F.C. players
Sheffield Wednesday F.C. players
Derby County F.C. players
Lincoln City F.C. players
Arbroath F.C. players
English Football League players